Gaël Junior Etock (born 5 July 1993) is a Cameroonian footballer who most recently played for FC Lahti in Finland as a striker or winger.

Club career
On 18 August 2012, Gaël made his debut with Sporting B in a 2012–13 Segunda Liga home match against Vitória de Guimarães B where he played 68 minutes. On 26 August 2012, he scored his first goal in a 1-3 away win against Atlético.

On 4 April 2016 he signed for JJK Jyväskylä.

After leaving Riga FC in the summer 2018, Etock signed with FC Honka for the 2019 season. The deal was announced already on 15 November 2018. He played three cup games for the club before he terminated his contract with the club, after failing to break into the team. On 12 April 2019, FC Lahti announced that he had signed a 4-month contract with the club.

References

External links 
 
 Stats and profile at LPFP 
 Football talk with Gael Etock
 

1993 births
Living people
Cameroonian footballers
Cameroonian expatriate footballers
FC Barcelona players
Sporting CP footballers
Sporting CP B players
Cercle Brugge K.S.V. players
Hapoel Tel Aviv F.C. players
Hapoel Petah Tikva F.C. players
JJK Jyväskylä players
FC Honka players
FC Lahti players
Expatriate footballers in Spain
Cameroonian expatriate sportspeople in Spain
Expatriate footballers in Portugal
Cameroonian expatriate sportspeople in Portugal
Expatriate footballers in Belgium
Cameroonian expatriate sportspeople in Belgium
Expatriate footballers in Israel
Cameroonian expatriate sportspeople in Israel
Expatriate footballers in Finland
Cameroonian expatriate sportspeople in Finland
Belgian Pro League players
Israeli Premier League players
Ykkönen players
Veikkausliiga players
Footballers from Douala
Association football forwards
Cameroon youth international footballers